The Vermont Department of Health is state department responsible for the health of Vermont in the United States. It is a sub-division of the Vermont Agency of Human Services. As of March 2017, the Department of Health is led by Mark Levine, MD. Dr. Levine was appointed  the Commissioner of Health by Governor Phil Scott.

District offices 
Vermont's Health department has a centralized structure; this structure typical does not have a separate local public health department (such as county level government) and local health units are state employees. The central office is located in Burlington, Vermont with several local health departments in 12 communities including Barre, Bennington, Brattleboro, Burlington, Middlebury, Morrisville, Newport, Rutland, Springfield, St. Albans, St. Johnsbury, and White River Junction.

Public Health Department Accreditation 
The Vermont Department of Health became a national accredited public health department in 2014 by the Public Health Accreditation Board.

References

External links 
Our Vision & Mission
Home Page | Disabilities, Aging and Independent Living 
Departments | Agency of Human Services
Our Leaders
 
 
CDC - Accredited Health Departments - Health Department Accreditation - STLT Gateway

Health departments in the United States
Public health
State agencies of Vermont
State departments of health of the United States
Healthcare in Vermont
Medical and health organizations based in Vermont
Organizations based in Burlington, Vermont